Wrightington is a civil parish in the West Lancashire district of Lancashire, England.  It contains 35 buildings that are recorded in the National Heritage List for England as designated listed buildings.  Of these, four are at Grade II*, the middle grade, and the others are at Grade II, the lowest grade.  The parish is mainly rural, and contains the village of Appley Bridge and the community of Wrightington Bar.  A high proportion of the listed buildings in the parish are houses or cottages and associated structures, or farmhouses and farm buildings.  The Leeds and Liverpool Canal runs through the parish and two of its locks are listed.  The other listed buildings include churches, a school, a bridge, and a milestone.


Key

Buildings

References

Citations

Sources

Lists of listed buildings in Lancashire
Buildings and structures in the Borough of West Lancashire